Steven L. Trout (born October 4, 1984) is an American college baseball coach and former infielder. He is the head baseball coach of Texas State University. Trout played college baseball at Texarkana College from 2004 to 2005 before transferring to Texas Christian University where he played for coach Jim Schlossnagle in 2006 and 2007.

Playing career
Trout attended Hooks High School in Hooks, Texas. Trout played for the school's varsity baseball, football, basketball and golf. Trout then enrolled at Texarkana College, to play college baseball for the Texarkana Bulldogs team.

As a freshman at Texarkana College in 2004, Trout had a .312 batting average, 8 home runs, and 25 RBIs.

As a sophomore in 2005, Trout batted .353 with four home runs.

In the 2006 season as a junior, Trout hit .286 with 2 home runs and 33 RBIs.

Trout had his best season as a senior in 2007, hitting a career high in doubles (18), home runs (4), RBIs (44), batting average (.326) and slugging (.455). He was named 2nd team All-Mountain West Conference.

Trout then played half a season each for the Macon Music, Fort Worth Cats, and the Kansas City T-Bones.

Coaching career
In 2009, Trout was named a volunteer assistant for the Texas State Bobcats baseball program. In August 2010, Trout was named a volunteer assistant for the Houston Cougars baseball team. Trout became the head baseball coach at Texarkana College in the fall of 2011, replacing Will Bolt, and was the head coach for the 2012 season. On June 14, 2012, Trout was named the hitting coach of the West Virginia Mountaineers baseball team. Trout returned to the Texas State staff as a paid assistant in the fall of 2015.

On July 1, 2019, Trout was named the head coach of Texas State. After a record-setting 2022 season in which Texas State set a program record with 47 wins, won the Sun Belt regular season championship, and reached the finals of the Stanford Regional, Trout signed a 5-year extension through the 2027 season.

Head coaching record

See also
 List of current NCAA Division I baseball coaches

References

External links

TCU profile
Texas Statep rofile

Living people
1984 births
Baseball third basemen
Fort Worth Cats players
Houston Cougars baseball coaches
Kansas City T-Bones players
Macon Music players
TCU Horned Frogs baseball players
Texarkana Bulldogs baseball coaches
Texarkana Bulldogs baseball players
Texas State Bobcats baseball coaches
West Virginia Mountaineers baseball coaches
Texas Christian University alumni
People from Hooks, Texas
Baseball coaches from Texas